The western Indian state Gujarat has 33 districts after several splits of the original 17 districts at the formation of the state in 1960.

Kutch is the largest district of Gujarat while Dang is the smallest. Ahmedabad is the most populated district while Dang is the least.

There are 252 Talukas (subdivisions of districts) in Gujarat.

History

1960 
Gujarat state was created on 1 May 1960, out of the 17 northern districts of Bombay State when that was split on a linguistic basis (also creating Marathi speaking Maharashtra).

They are as follow : Ahmedabad, Amreli, Banaskantha, Bharuch, Bhavnagar, Dang, Jamnagar, Junagadh, Kheda, Kachchh, Mehsana, Panchmahal, Rajkot, Sabarkantha, Surat, Surendranagar and Vadodara.

1964 
In 1964, Gandhinagar was formed from parts of Ahmedabad and Mehsana.

1966 
In 1966, Valsad was split from Surat.

1997 
On 2 October 1997, five new districts were created:
Anand was split from Kheda.
Dahod was split from Panchmahal.
Narmada was split from Bharuch.
Navsari was split from Valsad.
Porbandar was split from Junagadh.

2000 
In 2000, Patan District was formed from parts of Banaskantha and Mehsana.

2007 
On 2 October 2007, Tapi was split from Surat, as the state's 26th district.

2013 
On 15 August 2013, seven new districts were created:
Aravalli was split from Sabarkantha.
Botad was created from parts of Ahmedabad and Bhavanagar districts.
Chhota Udaipur was split from Vadodara District.
Devbhoomi Dwarka was split from Jamnagar.
Mahisagar was created from parts of Kheda and Panchmahal.
Morbi was created from parts of Rajkot, Surendranagar and Jamnagar districts.
Gir Somnath was split from Junagadh.

List of districts

Demographics of districts

Former districts

See also 

 List of cities in Gujarat by population
 List of metropolitan areas in Gujarat
 List of million-plus urban agglomerations in India
 List of states and union territories of India by population

References

External links 

 Districts of Gujarat: At a Glance
 Govt Of India site shows Districts of Gujarat
 Govt of Gujarat site shows profile of each districts

 
 
Districts, List of, Gujarat
Gujarat, Lists of districts